Undiluted is an album by jazz pianist Wynton Kelly that was recorded in 1965 and released by Verve label with Paul Chambers and Jimmy Cobb.

Reception
The Allmusic review awarded the album 3 stars.

Track listing
 "Bobo" (Wynton Kelly) - 4:02
 "Swingin Till the Girls Come Home" (Oscar Pettiford) - 6:33
 "My Ship" (Kurt Weill, Ira Gershwin) - 3:51
 "Out Front" (Rudy Stevenson) - 4:00
 "Never" (Stevenson) - 4:04
 "Blues on Purpose" (Stevenson) - 4:52
 "If You Could See Me Now" (Tadd Dameron, Carl Sigman) - 3:48
 "Six Eight" (Stevenson) - 4:59
Recorded at Rudy Van Gelder Studio in Englewood Cliffs, NJ, on February 5, 1965

Personnel
Wynton Kelly - piano
Paul Chambers - bass
Jimmy Cobb - drums
Rudy Stevenson - flute (track 1)
Unknown musician - percussion (track 1)

References

1965 albums
Verve Records albums
Wynton Kelly albums
Albums recorded at Van Gelder Studio
Albums produced by Creed Taylor